This is a list of combat vehicles of World War I, including conceptual, experimental, prototype, training and production vehicles. The vehicles in this list were either used in combat, produced or designed during the First World War.
World War One saw the start of modern armoured warfare with an emphasis on using motor vehicles to provide support to the infantry.

Key

Tanks

Tanks came about as means to break the stalemate of trench warfare. They were developed to break through barbed wire and destroy enemy machine gun posts. The British and the French were the major users of tanks during the war; tanks were a lower priority for Germany as it assumed a defensive strategy. The few tanks that Germany built were outnumbered by the number of French and British tanks captured and reused.

France

Germany

Italy
 Ansaldo Turrinelli armoured tortoise *
 Fiat 2000 ‡

Russia
 Mendeleyev tank *
 Rybinsk tank †
 Vezdekhod †
 Vezdekhod II *

United Kingdom

United Kingdom & United States
 Mark VIII ‡

United States

Armoured cars and trucks

Most of the armoured cars of the war were produced by building armoured bodywork over commercial large car and truck chassis. 

Austria-Hungary
 Austro-Daimler armoured car
 Gonsior-Opp-Frank armoured car *
 Junovicz armoured car
 Romfell armoured car

Belgium
 Minerva armoured car
 SAVA armoured car

Canada
 Armoured Autocar
 Jeffery-Russel armoured car

Denmark
 HtK46 armoured car †

France

 Archer armoured car 
 Charron armoured car
 Dion-Bouton armoured car 1914 †
 Dion-Bouton armoured car 1916 †
 Gasnier armoured car †
 Hotchkiss armoured car
 Latil armoured car
 Panhard armoured car
 Peugeot armoured car
 Renault armoured car 
 Renault 47mm autocanon
 Vinot Deguinguand armoured car †
 White AM armoured car

Germany

 Büssing A5P
 Daimler 15
 Ehrhardt E-V/4
 Mannesmann MULAG armoured truck
 Marienwagen II armoured halftrack †

Italy
 Bianchi armoured car
 Fiat-Terni armoured car
 Lancia 1Z
 Lancia 1ZM
 Pavesi 35 PS armoured car

Ottoman Empire
 Hotchkiss armoured car

Poland
 Pilsudski armoured car

Russia

United Kingdom

 AC armoured car †
 Austin armoured car
 Delaunay-Belleville armoured car
 Ford Model T armoured car
 Isotta-Fraschini armoured car
 Lanchester armoured car
 Leyland armoured lorry
 Peerless armoured car
 Peerless armoured lorry
 Pierce-Arrow armoured lorry
 Rolls-Royce armoured car
 Seabrook armoured lorry
 Sheffield-Simplex armoured car
 Sizaire-Berwick wind wagon †
 Talbot armoured car
 Wolseley armoured car
 Wolseley CP armoured car

United States
 Davidson-Cadillac armored car
 King armored car
 Mack armored car †
 White armored car

Self-propelled artillery

France

Germany
 A7V Flakpanzer †
 Leichte Kraftwagengeschutze 7.7cm L-27 flak

Italy
 Lancia 1Z 75-27 autocannone
 SPA 9000C 102-35 autocannone

Russia
 Russo Balt T 76mm AA gun

United Kingdom
 Emplacement Destroyer No. 1, 1A, 2 & 3 *
 Gun Carrier Mark I - carrier based on Mark I tank for 6-inch howitzer or 60-pdr gun.
 Peerless armoured AA lorry
 Pierce-Arrow armoured AA lorry - 40mm QF 2-pounder gun on lorry chassis
 QF 13-pounder 6 cwt AA gun on Thornycroft J lorry

United States
 Holt 55-1 3-inch AA gun † - delivered in 1917
 Holt Mark I (8-inch howitzer) † - 3 built and tested in 1918
 Holt Mark II (155mm M1918 gun) †
 Holt Mark III (240mm howitzer) †
 Holt Mark IV (240mm howitzer) †
 Christie 3-inch AA gun †
 Christie 8-inch self-propelled howitzer †

Armoured trains

Austria-Hungary
 MAVAG Typ AE panzerzug

Belgium
 Light armoured train

Belgium & United Kingdom
 Heavy "Anglo-Belgian" armoured train

Germany
 Deutsches Heer armoured train

Russia
 Zaamurets armoured train

South Africa
 South African Engineer Corps armoured train

United Kingdom
 GNR(I) armoured train
 LNWR armoured train ("Norma" and "Alice")
 Royal Navy armoured train
 Simplex armoured train
 Uganda Railway armoured train

Other vehicles

Canada
 Saczeany tank * 

France
 Aubriot Gabet armoured tractor †
 Boirault machine I and II †
 Breton-Prétot machine (armed tractor) †
 Frot-Turmel-Laffly landship †
 Renault FT TSF (radio tank)
 Souain armoured tractor †

Germany
 Marienwagen I †
 Orion Wagen I †
 Treffas Wagen  †

Italy
 Gussalli assault car †

Russia
 Tsar "tank" †

United Kingdom
 AEC B type armoured lorry
 Gun Carrier Mark II *
 Killen-Strait armoured tractor †
 Mark I converted to supply tank
 Mark I fitted with wireless communications 
 Mark IX
 Pedrail Machine †
 Salvage Machine

United States
 Holt 150 ton field monitor *
 Holt G9 armored tractor †
 Steam Wheel "tank" †
 Studebaker supply tank †

See also
 List of armoured fighting vehicles
 Lists of World War I topics
 Military technology during World War I and the interwar years
 Technology during World War I

References

Bibliography

External links

 Articles on WWI Tanks and Armored cars at Tank Encyclopedia

Armoured fighting vehicles of World War I
World War I
Combat vehicles